Chichester is a station on the Tyne and Wear Metro serving the Chichester, Laygate, Westoe and West Park areas of South Tyneside, as well as the nearby South Tyneside College campus. The station is affectionately referred to as 'Chi' by locals.

The station was used by approximately 390,000 passengers in 2017-18.

The Tyne & Wear Metro station at Chichester was opened in March 1984, and completed the initial Metro network. It was originally a station on the Green Line from Bank Foot (until 1991), and later, Airport. Since 2005, the station has been on the Yellow Line from St. James.

A statue of Queen Victoria had been moved to Chichester in 1949, from its original position in front of South Shields Town Hall. In 1981, it was removed to make way for the new Metro station at Chichester, and returned to its original position at the front of the Town Hall, where it remains today.

Chichester is situated on the former Stanhope & Tyne Railway route, rather than the former Brandling Junction Railway route via High Shields.

Part of this line had been transferred into National Coal Board ownership, and to the south of the station was a single-track electrified freight line, part of the Harton Colliery system. In the early 1990s, this line was de-electrified, and following the closure of Westoe Colliery in 1993, has been closed completely.

The former colliery line along Chichester Road was regenerated in the late 1990s, being replaced with a supermarket. The line itself was also the spot of the Westoe Netty, an open air public urinal which was depicted in a famous 1972 painting by Bob Olley. These toilets were saved when the colliery line was demolished, and are now preserved at the Beamish Open Air Museum in County Durham. In regards to the station, the colliery line ran behind Platform 2 with the tunnel beneath the concourse still visible from the Dean Road bridge.

Chichester was intended as one of the original interchange stations, which meant buses were timetabled to interchange with Metro services.  This arrangement broke down after the deregulation of local bus services in 1986. Today, Chichester still serves as one of the Metro's main bus interchanges, due to the close proximity of the Stagecoach bus depot,  but now serves mainly for nearby residential areas, as well as the South Tyneside College campus.

The platforms at Chichester are below street level, however the ticket hall is at ground level. The ticket hall contains two ticket machines and a newsagent. The station also houses four bicycle lockers.

Following the opening of the new South Shields Interchange in August 2019, Chichester is the single remaining station on the branch from Pelaw to South Shields which has yet to be refurbished.

In November 2014, two pieces of artwork produced by community group Bright Futures were installed in the station. It is also unique in having station signage in blue, instead of the original yellow, due to an advertising deal with South Tyneside College.

Services

, the station is served by up to five trains per hour on weekdays and Saturday, and up to four trains per hour during the evening and on Sunday.

Rolling stock used: Class 599 Metrocar

References

External links
 
 Timetable and station information for Chichester

Railway stations in Great Britain opened in 1984
1984 establishments in England
Metro stations in South Shields